The Department of Printing is a government agency of Nepal assigned with the responsibilities of printing on behalf of the Government of Nepal. Since 2008, the Department publishes the national Government gazette of Nepal, Nepal Gazette. Since 2016, the Department also publishes online versions of the gazette on its website, making more than 120,000 copies of the Nepal Gazette published between 1951 and 2014 available to the public. Furthermore it offers security printing services including printing Nepali Citizenship Certificates or Certificates of educational institutions.

History
In 1851, the first printing press was introduced to Nepal. The first governmental newspaper, Gorkhapatra, was printed from 1901 on by the Government of Nepal. That press was transformed into a governmental department, the Printing and Publication Department of Nepal in 1989. The last change so far was in 1992, when the Department was renamed to the Department of Printing. In February 2017, the Department proposed to also print Nepalese banknotes, which are currently not printed in Nepal.

References

Government departments of Nepal
1992 establishments in Nepal